Horizon Christian Academy is a private, non-denominational Christian school in Cumming, Georgia, United States.  The school educates about 225 students in kindergarten through 12th grade.

History
Horizon's high school division was started in 2000 by the school's founder Garin Berry, and the elementary was started in 2004.

Championships 
 2020 Football State Champion
 2016-2017: Boys' Basketball Division I-A
 2015-2016: Boys' Basketball Division I-A
 2015-2016: Football Runner-Up Division II
 2014-2015: Volleyball Division II
 2013-2014: Volleyball Division II
 2013-2014: Boys' Basketball Division II-A

References

External links
Horizon Christian Academy official website

Christian schools in Georgia (U.S. state)
Educational institutions established in 2000
Nondenominational Christian schools in the United States
Private high schools in Georgia (U.S. state)
Private middle schools in Georgia (U.S. state)
Private elementary schools in Georgia (U.S. state)
Schools in Forsyth County, Georgia
2000 establishments in Georgia (U.S. state)